Julia Ryjanova (also known as Julia Galianina and Julia Galianina-Ryjanova; ; born 15 May 1974) is a Russian and Australian chess player with the title of Woman Grandmaster (WGM). She competed in the Women's World Chess Championship in 2001.

Chess career 
Ryjanova was awarded the title Woman Grandmaster by FIDE in 2000. In the same year, she won the bronze medal in the Russian Women's Chess Championship in Elista.

She has been ranked in FIDE's top 50 highest rated female chess players in the world during the early 2000s. Her best ranking is the 40th highest rated female chess player in the world in January 2003, with a rating of 2415.

Ryjanova stopped playing in official competitions in 2003 to work as a chess coach in Qatar, and has been the captain of the Qatari women's chess team since 2008.

In January 2015, Ryjanova tied for fourth place in the Australian Open Chess Championship and won the Australian Women's Masters. In 2017, she transferred federations to represent Australia.

Oceania Chess Women's champion 2019 and 2023 -

References

External links 
 
 Julia Ryjanova chess games at 365Chess.com
 Julia Galianina Ryjanova chess games at 365Chess.com
 

1974 births
Living people
Chess woman grandmasters
Chess coaches
Female sports coaches
Australian female chess players
Australian people of Russian descent
Russian female chess players
People from Orenburg